Eurytides callias  is a butterfly of the family Papilionidae. It is found in French Guiana, Brazil (Amazonas), southern Venezuela (Yavita, Rio Ocamo, Rio Cunucunuma), eastern Ecuador (Napo) and Peru.

References

Butterflies described in 1906
Papilionidae
Papilionidae of South America